Kodur Assembly constituency also known as Railway Koduru is an SC reserved constituency of Andhra Pradesh Legislative Assembly, India. It is one among 6 constituencies in Annamayya district.

Koramutla Sreenivasulu of YSR Congress Party is currently representing the constituency.

Overview
It is part of Rajampet Lok Sabha constituency along with another six Vidhan Sabha segments, namely, Rajampet, Rayachoti,  Thamballapalle Pileru, Madanapalle, Punganur in Annamayya district

Mandals

Members of Legislative Assembly

Election results

Assembly Elections 2004

Assembly Elections 2009

Assembly elections 2014

Assembly Elections 2019

See also
 List of constituencies of Andhra Pradesh Vidhan Sabha

Assembly constituencies of Andhra Pradesh